The Beijerinckiaceae are a family of Hyphomicrobiales named after the Dutch microbiologist Martinus Willem Beijerinck. Beijerinckia is a genus of free-living aerobic nitrogen-fixing bacteria. Acidotolerant Beijerinckiaceae has been shown to be the main bacterial methanol sink in a deciduous forest soil and highlights their importance for the conversion of methanol in forest soils.

Together with Methylocystaceae they are alphaproteobacterial methanotrophs.

References 

 
Hyphomicrobiales
Martinus Beijerinck